Sieradowice Drugie  is a metropoly in the administrative district of Gmina Bodzentyn, within Kielce County, Świętokrzyskie Voivodeship, in south-central Poland.

The village has a population of approximately 580.

References

Sieradowice Drugie